Bolkly is a neighbourhood in Alexandria, Egypt. The neighborhood is officially named Bulkeley, written as Bolkly. In speech however, the name has been modified over generations into a more pronounceable one for the local tongue, "Bokla". The name could be connected to the historic Baucalis district.

See also 

 Neighborhoods in Alexandria

Bolkly